The Coffee Pot, also known simply as Coffee Pot, with a shape suggesting a coffee pot, is an unpopulated steep, rocky islet located close to the south-western coast of Tasmania, Australia.

Fauna
The islet is part of the Port Davey Islands Important Bird Area, so identified by BirdLife International because of its importance for breeding seabirds. The black-faced cormorant breeds on the islet.

See also

 List of islands of Tasmania

References

Islands of Tasmania
South West Tasmania
Important Bird Areas of Tasmania